Anápolis Air Force Base – ALA2  is a base of the Brazilian Air Force, located in Anápolis, Brazil.

History
The history of Anápolis Air Force Base begins on 9 February 1970, when its construction started, with the main purpose of receiving the new air force fighter at the time, the Mirage III, designated by the Brazilian Air Force as F-103. For strategic reasons, was decided that the new air base would be close to the capital Brasília. After several studies (including issues of air traffic and radio interference) the choice was the city of Anápolis, located 160 km from Brasília.

The facility became operational on 23 August 1972, with the completion of the airstrip. A new air unit, specially created to operate the F-103, was then activated: the 1st Air Defense Wing (1º ALADA). This unit was decommissioned on 19 April 1979, transferring its mission to the 1st Air Defense Group (1º GDA), the unit was responsible for operating the F-103 until 2005. In 2006, started to operate the Mirage 2000, already retired. Currently operates the F-5EM & FM.

From 2021 operates the JAS 39 Gripen, designated by Brazil as F-39 E & F.

Units
The following units are based at Anápolis Air Force Base:

The base also operates a battery of surface to air missile called 3rd Air Defense Group (3º GDAAE).

Retired aircraft

Access
The base is located 12 km from downtown Anápolis.

See also
List of Brazilian military bases

References

External links

Goiás
Brazilian Air Force
Brazilian Air Force bases
Buildings and structures in Goiás
Anápolis
Airports established in 1972